Broom's Bloom is a historic home located in Bel Air, Harford County, Maryland, United States. It is a two-story, frame and rubblestone, gable-roofed house, partially stuccoed and partially shingled. It took its present form from four distinct and discernible periods of growth, from about 1747 to about 1950. Also on the property is a one-story, rubblestone 18th century springhouse and a small family cemetery, which contains the earliest known grave stones in the county.

Broom's Bloom was listed on the National Register of Historic Places in 1991.

References

External links
, including photo from 1991, Maryland Historical Trust

Houses on the National Register of Historic Places in Maryland
Houses in Bel Air, Harford County, Maryland
Houses completed in 1747
Hall and parlor houses
National Register of Historic Places in Harford County, Maryland